Logan Dorsey (born July 9, 2002) is an American soccer player who plays as a forward for Gonzaga Bulldogs.

Personal
Logan is the younger brother of American soccer player Griffin Dorsey who plays as a winger.

References

External links
Profile at US Development Academy

2002 births
Living people
Colorado Springs Switchbacks FC players
American soccer players
Association football forwards
People from Evergreen, Colorado
Soccer players from Colorado
USL Championship players
Gonzaga Bulldogs men's soccer players